New Dreams Ltd. is the third studio album by American electronic musician Vektroid under the alias Laserdisc Visions  released on July 1, 2011. The album is an early example of the genre vaporwave.

Release
The album was released through the independent label Beer on the Rug and Vektroid's own label PrismCorp. The album has good reviews and is one of Vektroid's more popular releases. A digital reissue of the album in 2012 included six bonus tracks, but removed the reverberated Japanese commercials that played for the length of the original release, leaving only the original and sample-based compositions.

Track listing

See also
2011 in music
Ambient music

References

External links
Bandcamp
WhoSampled

Vektroid albums
2011 albums
Vaporwave albums